Ken Charlton (born March 20, 1941) is a retired American basketball player.  He is known best for his All-American college career at the University of Colorado.

Charlton, a 6'6" forward from Denver, Colorado, led Denver South High School to a state championship as a junior in 1958.  He decided to attend the University of Colorado and starred for his three varsity seasons.  In his junior and senior seasons, Charlton led the Buffs to back to back Regional Final appearances in the 1962 and 1963 NCAA Tournaments.  Charlton led the team in scoring both seasons, and in 1963 he was named the Midwest Regional Most Outstanding player after scoring 49 points in two contests.  In his senior year, Charlton was also named a first team All-American by the United States Basketball Writers Association and was a member of the first Academic All-American team ever named in basketball.

Charlton left Colorado with 1,352 points and graduated as the school's all-time leading scorer (since passed).  He is a member of the University of Colorado's Athletic Hall of Fame and his #23 jersey has been honored by the school.

Following his graduation from Colorado, Charlton was drafted by the Cincinnati Royals in the fourth round of the 1963 NBA draft.  He did not play in the NBA, but instead played for the Denver Chicago Truckers in the Amateur Athletic Union (AAU).

References

External links
College statistics at the Draft Review

1941 births
Living people
All-American college men's basketball players
Amateur Athletic Union men's basketball players
American men's basketball players
Basketball players from Denver
Basketball players from Oklahoma
Cincinnati Royals draft picks
Colorado Buffaloes men's basketball players
Small forwards
Sportspeople from Oklahoma City